4am Friday is the third studio album by Avail. It is named after the day and time the band received news of Bob Baynor's death (of the band Maximillian Colby). The song "F.C.A." was also written about Bob. It was released in 1996 on Lookout! Records and reissued in 2006 by Jade Tree Records. The reissue also includes the Live at the Bottom of the Hill in San Francisco album.

Track listing

References

Avail albums
1996 albums
Lookout! Records albums